Acharya Chinmoy Lahiri (20 March 1920 – 17 August 1984) was an Indian vocalist from Bengal in the Hindustani classical tradition. He is known for the Khayal form of singing, as well as for his popular renditions of Dhrupad, Thumri and Tappa, along with Bengali Raga-pradhan songs.

Early life 
Archrya Chinmoy Lahiri was born in a Zamindar family of Tantibandh, Pabna district, in the undivided India under British rule. His father Jeeb Chandra Lahiri was a civil engineer, an alumnus of Bengal Engineering College, Shibpur, and his mother's name was Sarajubala Debi. He was brought up in Lucknow in his early years, where his father was working. His first teacher in music was Rabin Chattopadhyay. His passion for music brought Chinmoy to Morris College of Music, Lucknow, where he took music lessons from Pandit Srikrishna Narayan Ratanjhankar, principal of the college. There he was accompanied with some young and talented students who all became great masters afterwards, such as V.G. Jog, S. C. R. Bhat and Dhruvtara Joshi etc. Subsequently, he took talim, lessons in music, from Dilip Chandra Bedi, Khalifa Khurshid Ali Khan, and Chhotey Khan. Chinmoy was a Gāndā-bāndh śāgīrd (disciple) of Pandit Ratanjhankar, who was a disciple of Pandit Bhatkhande and Ustad Faiaz Khan. From this lineage an inclination of Acharya Chinmoy towards Senia Gharana of Lucknow may be arrived at.

Professional career
In 1936 Acharya Lahiri started his career in music as an approved artist in the All India Radio Lucknow station. He then joined Dhaka Radio. His first record was published in 1944 by HMV with two music tracks of Bengali Khyal, ‘Nā māne mānā’ and ‘Duwāre elo ke’ written by Gopal Dasgupta with his own music composition. During partition of India in 1947 Acharya Lahiri shifted to 'Calcutta' (Kolkata). His fame as a good music teacher spread wide and in 1967 he joined Rabindra Bharati University as a Professor in Music to continue till he breathed his last.

Music of Acharya Lahiri
Archrya Chinmoy Lahiri represented an era of enlightenment in Bengal in the early 20th century, when, among other fields, Indian Classical Music too were being experimented with in the light of regional variations. Among the doyens of Indian Classical Music of Bengal of that time, Vishmadev Chattopadhyay, Tarapada Chakraborty, Jnanendra Prashad Goswami and Chinmoy Lahiri deserve special mention. Apart from pure Indian classical music, Acharya Chinmoy Lahiri was proficient and was an exponent of Khyal, Thumri, Geet, Gazal and Raga-pradhan songs. He created many Ragas too and wrote Bandish for many of the Ragas.

Contribution in Indian Classical Music
Archrya Chinmoy Lahiri created many Ragas, such as Shyamkos, Yogamaya, Prabhati Todi, Rajani Kalyan, Kushumi Kalyan, Gandharika, Nag Ranjani, Mangalati, Shivani and Shubhra. 

Bandish created by Acharya Chinmoy Lahiri
Khyal: Bandhish written by Chinmoy Lahiri mostly depicts the sacred love of Radha and Krishna

Thumri: A form of Indian Classical Music (semi-classical). Romantic poetic songs developed during Mughal era around Lucknow based on Bawra songs. There are a few Bandhish written by Chinmoy Lahiri for Thumri songs:

Kajri and Chaiti: Forms of Indian Classical Music (semi-classical) practiced in Doab region based on folk tradition. Following is a Bandhish written by Chinmoy Lahiri in Kajri :

Contribution in Bengali Movies
Archrya Chinmoy Lahiri's first performance as a playback singer was in the year 1950 in the Bengali film Maandanda starring actor Chhabi Biswas. He also contributed his voice in films ‘Dvairath’, ‘Antaraal’, ‘Shapmochan’, ‘Jeebanniye’ ‘Bapu ne kaha tha’ etc. His song "ত্রিবেণী তীর্থ পথে" (Tribenī tīrtha pathe) became a milestone in the history of Bengali film music, in the film ‘Shap Mochan’ in 1955, sung in duet with Pratima Bandopadhyay, starring Uttam Kumar and Suchitra Sen. He composed music for Bengali movie Jiban Niye in 1976.

Awards and recognition
Acharya Chinmoy Lahiri was felicitated by Morris College with the title of Sangit Visharad'''.

Legacy
Acharya Lahiri's legacy is being carried forward by his disciples. Though he did not belong to any Gharana, he created his own style or Gharana. Names of a few of his disciples are Parveen Sultana, Mandira Lahiri, Shyamlal Lahiri etc.
Pandit Lahiri wrote two books, "Magan Geet" and "Taan Manjari".   

MemoirsBidushi Mandira Lahiri, wife of Pandit Shyamlal Lahiri, remembered about his father-in-law Pandit Chinmoy Lahiri in his interview recorded by Rajeswary Ganguly Banerjee on the behest of Rabindra Bharati University, that Pandit'' Lahiri always stressed on punctuality and was very strict as a Guru while enacting Riyaz (practice sessions). His frequently used phrase was "karo ya maro".

References 

1920 births
1984 deaths
Recipients of the Bharat Ratna
Hindustani singers
Indian Hindus
Indian classical musicians of Bengal
People from Pabna District
Singers from Kolkata